Delaware Township is one of eleven townships in Ripley County, Indiana. As of the 2010 census, its population was 1,437 and it contained 578 housing units.

Geography

Unincorporated towns
 Delaware
 Lookout
 Prattsburg

Education
Delaware Township residents may obtain a free library card from the Osgood Public Library Central Library in Osgood, or its branch in Milan.

References

External links
 Indiana Township Association
 United Township Association of Indiana

Townships in Ripley County, Indiana
Townships in Indiana